Rhopalophora is a genus of beetles in the family Cerambycidae, containing the following species:

 Rhopalophora angustata Schaeffer, 1905
 Rhopalophora baracoana Zayas, 1975
 Rhopalophora bicolorella Knull, 1934
 Rhopalophora casignata Martins & Napp, 1989
 Rhopalophora collaris (Germar, 1824)
 Rhopalophora cupricollis Guérin-Méneville, 1844
 Rhopalophora dyseidia Martins & Napp, 1989
 Rhopalophora eximia Bates, 1892
 Rhopalophora lineicollis Chevrolat, 1859
 Rhopalophora longipes (Say, 1824)
 Rhopalophora meeskei Casey, 1891
 Rhopalophora miniatocollis Chevrolat, 1859
 Rhopalophora neivai Mendes, 1940
 Rhopalophora nigriventris Bates, 1885
 Rhopalophora occipitalis Chevrolat, 1859
 Rhopalophora paraensis Martins & Napp, 1989
 Rhopalophora prolixa Monné, 1989
 Rhopalophora prorubra Knull, 1944
 Rhopalophora pulverulenta Guérin-Méneville, 1844
 Rhopalophora punctatipennis Linsley, 1935
 Rhopalophora rubecula Bates, 1880
 Rhopalophora rugicollis (LeConte, 1858)
 Rhopalophora serripennis Giesbert & Chemsak, 1993
 Rhopalophora tenuis (Chevrolat, 1855)
 Rhopalophora venezuelensis Chevrolat, 1859
 Rhopalophora yucatana Giesbert & Chemsak, 1993

References

 
Rhopalophorini
Cerambycidae genera